Haloferacaceae is a family of halophilic, chemoorganotrophic or heterotrophic archaea within the order Haloferacales. The type genus of this family is Haloferax. Its biochemical characteristics are the same as the order Haloferacales.

The name Haloferacaceae is derived from the Latin term Haloferax, referring to the type genus of the family and the suffix "-ceae", an ending used to denote a family. Together, Haloferacaceae refers to a family whose nomenclatural type is the genus Haloferax.

Taxonomy and molecular signatures 
As of 2021, Haloferacaceae contains 10 validly published genera. This family can be molecularly distinguished from other Halobacteria by the presence of five conserved signature proteins (CSPs) and four conserved signature indels (CSIs) present in the following proteins: thermosome, ribonuclease BN and hypothetical proteins.

Phylogeny
The currently accepted taxonomy is based on the List of Prokaryotic names with Standing in Nomenclature (LPSN) and National Center for Biotechnology Information (NCBI).

See also 
 List of Archaea genera

References 

Halobacteria
Archaea genera